The economy of Lesotho is based on agriculture, livestock, manufacturing, mining, and depends heavily on inflows of workers’ remittances and receipts from the Southern African Customs Union (SACU). Lesotho is geographically surrounded by South Africa and is economically integrated with it as well. The majority of households subsist on farming. The formal sector employment consist of mainly female workers in the apparel sector. While male migrant laborers work primarily as miners in South Africa for 3 to 9 months and employment in the Government of Lesotho (GOL). Half of the country's population work in informal crop cultivation or animal husbandry.

Lesotho, is a member of the Southern African Customs Union (SACU) in which tariffs have been eliminated on the trade of goods between other member countries, which also include Botswana, Namibia, South Africa, and Eswatini. Lesotho, Eswatini, Namibia, and South Africa also form a common currency and exchange control area known as the Rand Monetary Area that uses the South African rand as the common currency. In 1980, Lesotho introduced its own currency, the loti (plural: maloti). One hundred lisente equal one loti. The Loti is at par with the rand.

Economic history 
Until the political insecurity in September 1998, Lesotho's economy had grown steadily since 1992. The riots, however, destroyed nearly 80% of commercial infrastructure in Maseru and two other major towns in the country, having a disastrous effect on the country's economy. Nonetheless, the country has completed several IMF Structural Adjustment Programs, and inflation declined substantially over the course of the 1990s. Lesotho's trade deficit, however, is quite large, with exports representing only a small fraction of imports.

The global economic crisis hit the Lesotho economy hard through loss of textile exports and jobs in the sector due largely to the economic slowdown in the United States which is a major export destination, reduced diamond mining and exports, including  weak prices for diamonds;  drop in SACU revenues due to the economic slowdown in the South African economy, and reduction in worker remittances due to weakening of the South African economy and contraction of the mining sector and related job losses in South Africa. In 2009, GDP growth slowed to 0.9 percent.

Economic progress
Lesotho's progress in moving from a predominantly subsistence-oriented economy to a lower middle income, diversified economy exporting natural resources and manufacturing goods has brought higher, more secure incomes to a significant portion of the population.  The percentage of the population living below USD PPP US$1.25/day fell from 48 percent to 44 percent between 1995 and 2003. The unemployment rate in 2008 was 25.29% and rose to 27.2% in 2012. However, the unemployment rate fell to 23.06% in 2017. The percentage of the population living below the poverty line fell from 58% in 2002 to 49.2% in 2017. The country is still among the "Low Human Development" countries (rank 155 of 192) as classified by the UNDP, with 42.3 years of life expectancy at birth. However, adult literacy is very high - 82% and children under weight aged under 5 is only 20%.

Lesotho has received economic aid from a variety of sources, including the United States, the World Bank, the United Kingdom, the European Union, and Germany.

Lesotho has nearly 6,000 kilometers of unpaved and modern all-weather roads. There is a short rail line (freight) linking Lesotho with South Africa that is totally owned and operated by South Africa.

Sectors

Apparel 
Lesotho has taken advantage of the African Growth and Opportunity Act (AGOA) to become the largest exporter of garments to the US from sub-Saharan Africa. American Brands and retailers sourcing from Lesotho include: Foot Locker, Gap, Gloria Vanderbilt, JCPenny, Levi Strauss, Saks, Sears, Timberland and Wal-Mart. In mid-2004 its employment reached over 50,000 mainly female workers, marking the first time that manufacturing sector workers outnumbered government employees. In 2008 it exported 487 million dollars mainly to the United States. Since 2004 employment in the sector was somehow reduced to about 45,000, in mid-2011, due to intense international competition in the garment sector. It was the largest formal sector employer in Lesotho in 2011. The sector initiated a major program to fight HIV/AIDS, called Apparel Lesotho Alliance to Fight AIDS (ALAFA). It is an industry-wide program providing prevention and treatment for the workers.

Husbandry 

The western lowlands form the main agricultural zone. Almost 50% of the population earn income through informal crop cultivation or animal husbandry with nearly two-thirds of the country's income coming from the agricultural sector. About 70% of the population lives in rural areas and works in agriculture.

Women in the economy 
Women make up 51% of Lesotho's population. While women are more subject to access to secondary schooling than men, men make 1.5 times more income than women. Prior to the 1950s, Basotho women migrated to South Africa for work due to an agricultural decline. Of those who migrated, many of them were unwed and many stayed in South Africa. Married couples also traveled to South Africa together for work. In 1923, the pass law Natives (Urban Areas) Act was passed in South Africa which required black men to carry passports with them at all times when in white areas for work. Women were included in an amendment to the law in 1952. The amendment caused a decline in migration of female labor, and by the 1970s, only 36.1% of women over age 39 in Lesotho had worked in South Africa. Lesotho women did not work in mines.

In the 1980s, Lesotho received aid to help with the manufacturing industry. The main workers employed in the industry were young women. In 1990, 92% of employees in the textile industry were women.

About 86% of the female population in Lesotho works in the textile industry.

Natural resources
Water and diamonds are Lesotho's only significant natural resources. Water is being extracted through the 30-year, multibillion-dollar Lesotho Highlands Water Project (LHWP), which was initiated in 1986. The LHWP is designed to capture, store, and transfer water from the Orange River system and send it to South Africa's Free State and greater Johannesburg area, which features a large concentration of South African industry, population and agriculture. At the completion of the project, Lesotho should be almost completely self-sufficient in the production of electricity and also gain income from the sale of electricity to South Africa. The World Bank, African Development Bank, European Investment Bank, and many other bilateral donors are financing the project. Diamonds are produced in Letšeng, Mothae, Liqhobong and Kao mines. The sector suffered a setback in 2008 as the result of the world recession but rebounded in 2010 and 2011. It is a major contributor to the exports of Lesotho.

Other statistics
The following table shows the main economic indicators in 1980–2017.

Household income or consumption by percentage share:
lowest 10%:
0.9%
highest 10%:
43.4% (1986–87)

Industrial production growth rate:
3% (2010)

Electricity - consumption:
626 GWh (2010/11)

Agriculture - products:
maize, wheat, pulses, sorghum, barley; livestock

Currency:
1 loti (L) = 100 lisente; note - maloti (M) is the plural form of loti

Exchange rates:
maloti (M) per US$1 – 7.32 (2010), 6.10948 (1999), 3.62709 (1995); note - the Basotho loti is at par with the South African rand

See also
 Economy of Africa
 Lesotho
 List of Basotho companies
 Child labour in Lesotho
 United Nations Economic Commission for Africa

References

External links

 MBendi Lesotho overview
Lesotho latest trade data on ITC Trade Map

 
Lesotho
Lesotho